The Pentax smc D-FA 100 mm F2.8 Macro WR is a macro lens for K-mount announced by Pentax on December 9, 2009.

References
www.dpreview.com

External links

100
Pentax 100mm f/2.8